Landtag elections in the Free State of Brunswick (Freistaat Braunschweig) during the Weimar Republic were held at two-year, later three-year, intervals between 1918 and 1930. Results with regard to the total vote, the percentage of the vote won and the number of seats allocated to each party are presented in the tables below. On 31 March 1933, the sitting Landtag was dissolved by the Nazi-controlled central government and reconstituted to reflect the distribution of seats in the national Reichstag. The Landtag subsequently was formally abolished as a result of the "Law on the Reconstruction of the Reich" of 30 January 1934 which replaced the German federal system with a unitary state.

1918 
The 1918 Brunswick state election was held on 22 December 1918 to elect the 60 members of the Landtag.

1920 
The 1920 Brunswick state election was held on 16 May 1920 to elect the 60 members of the Landtag.

1922 
The 1922 Brunswick state election was held on 22 January 1922 to elect the 60 members of the Landtag.

1924 
The 1924 Brunswick state election was held on 7 December 1924 to elect the 48 members of the Landtag.

1927 
The 1927 Brunswick state election was held on 27 November 1927 to elect the 48 members of the Landtag.

1930 
The 1930 Brunswick state election was held on 14 September 1930 to elect the 40 members of the Landtag.

References

Elections in the Weimar Republic
Elections in Lower Saxony
History of Brunswick
Brunswick
Brunswick
Brunswick
Brunswick
Brunswick
Brunswick